
Dean "Tex" Martin: Country Style is a 1963 studio album by Dean Martin, arranged and conducted by Don Costa.

This was Martin's first album of country music, it was followed by Dean "Tex" Martin Rides Again later in 1963. This was the first of two albums that Martin released in 1963. Dean "Tex" Martin: Country Style peaked at 109 on the Billboard 200.

It was reissued on CD by Capitol Records in 2006.

Reception

The initial Billboard review from 26 January 1963 selected the album for its pop spotlight, and commentated that "...Dino sings them willingly over fine arrangements by Don Costa...Strong wax here". William Ruhlmann on Allmusic.com gave the album three stars out of five. Ruhlmann wrote that "The arrangements by Don Costa certainly weren't hardcore country, but there were guitars twanging away and Martin simply rolled over the top with his usual ease of delivery. The result was surprisingly pleasurable, and Country Style even spent several weeks in the charts".

Track listing

Personnel 
 Dean Martin – vocals
 Don Costa - arranger, conductor
 Chuck Sagle - producer
 James Burton - Guitar

References 

1963 albums
Dean Martin albums
Albums arranged by Don Costa
Albums conducted by Don Costa
Reprise Records albums